Furdag is a rural locality (a selo) in Urginsky Selsoviet, Khivsky District, Republic of Dagestan, Russia. The population was 201 as of 2010.

Geography 
Furdag is located 17 km north of Khiv (the district's administrative centre) by road. Urga is the nearest rural locality.

References 

Rural localities in Khivsky District